Anne Merrilyn Tolley  (née Hicks, born 1 March 1953) is a New Zealand politician and former member of the New Zealand House of Representatives representing the National Party. She was New Zealand's first female Minister of Education from 2008 to 2011 and the first Minister for Children from 2016 to 2017. During the Fifth National Government, she was also Minister of Social Development, Minister of Corrections, Minister of Police and Minister of Local Government. She served as Deputy Speaker of the House of Representatives from 2017 to 2020. She is currently the Chair of the Commission overseeing the Tauranga City Council, which was appointed after a review in 2020 identified significant governance problems within the Council.

Early life and family
Tolley was born in Wellington on 1 March 1953, the daughter of Mary Margaret Hicks (née Norris) and her husband Ronald James Hicks. She was educated at Colenso High School (now William Colenso College) in Napier, and spent time as a Rotary exchange student in Allentown, Pennsylvania, United States. She went on to gain a diploma in computer programming. In 1973 she married Allan Hunt Tolley, and the couple had three children. With her husband, Tolley ran a boutique hotel in Napier.

Local-body politics
In 1986 Tolley was elected as a member of the Napier City Council and remained in that role until 1995. She served as deputy mayor of Napier between 1989 and 1995, and was an elected member of the Hawke's Bay Regional Council from 1989 to 1992. She has been a Justice of the Peace since 1989.

While on Napier City Council, Tolley was involved in the establishment of a local-authority trading enterprise to run Marineland and the Napier Aquarium, the Emerson Street redevelopment project, and the redevelopment of McLean Park. She sought re-election in the 1995 local elections, but was defeated.

Parliamentary career

An independent on the Napier City Council, Tolley was encouraged to join the Labour Party by incumbent Napier MP Geoff Braybrooke but declined, instead joining the National Party. She was interested in being a candidate for National at the 1996 general election, but had not been a member of the party for long enough.

She challenged Braybrooke for the Napier seat in 1999. While unsuccessful in that contest, Tolley was elected as a list MP. In the 2002 election, she unsuccessfully contested the Napier seat against Braybrooke's successor, Russell Fairbrother. Along with many other National MPs, Tolley did not escape the collapse of the party's vote that year, and so did not return to Parliament as a list MP.

In the 2005 general election, Tolley successfully contested the East Coast electorate, including Whakatāne, Ōhope, Ōpōtiki, and Gisborne districts, beating Labour candidate Moana Mackey, daughter of the previous East Coast MP Janet Mackey. She held the electorate for four subsequent elections until her retirement in 2020.

She served as the first woman National Party whip from December 2006 until February 2008 when she became the party's Education spokesperson.

Minister of Education: 2008–2011
The National Party formed a government after the 2008 general election and Tolley was appointed Minister of Education, the first woman to hold that position. The key policy introduced during her term was introduction of the National Standards programme that measured children's progress against the curriculum in reading, writing and mathematics, in order to increase schools' accountability. The controversial proposals were opposed by many teachers and school principals, some of whom refused to implement the standards. In January 2010, Tolley's responsibilities for tertiary education were reassigned to Steven Joyce, with Prime Minister John Key stating that this would allow Tolley to focus on the implementation of national standards.

In June 2010, Tolley expressed concerns about a Parliamentary Library research paper that was critical of National Standards, calling it "unprofessional", "highly political" and so biased it could have been written by the union opposing the policy. Such papers are required by the Parliamentary Library to be politically neutral. A month later the New Zealand Principals Federation voted to support regional associations which boycotted training for National Standards. Tolley reminded principals that in her view it would be quicker and give better results to contact herself or the Ministry of Education with concerns about the changes, than to speak through the media.

The stand-off between Tolley and teachers was embarrassing for the Government and resulted in Cabinet changes after National was re-elected in November 2011. Hekia Parata was made Education Minister while Tolley was demoted in the Cabinet rankings, becoming Minister of Corrections and Police, succeeding Judith Collins who was promoted to Minister of Justice.

Minister of Police and Minister of Corrections: 2011–2014
In March 2012, one of her first major announcements as the Minister of Corrections was the proposed closure of the old prisons in Wellington and New Plymouth. She also said that a number of older units at Arohata, Rolleston, Rangipo and Waikeria prisons would close. Later that year, the Government awarded a 25-year contract to Serco to build a 960-bed prison at Wiri, South Auckland, at a cost of NZ$900 million. Tolley attended a sod-turning ceremony at the site of the new prison Wiri in September 2012.

In June 2012, Tolley as Police Minister was responsible for crushing the first "boy racer" car under the Vehicle Confiscation and Seizure Act.

Minister of Social Development and Minister for Children: 2014–2017 
When National was returned to government after the 2014 general election, Tolley succeeded Paula Bennett as Minister of Social Development. A key achievement during this term was reforming the Child, Youth and Family service within the Ministry of Social Development into a standalone agency, Oranga Tamariki, the Ministry for Children, after a Children's Commissioner report in 2015 found that the government had failed children in state care.

From September to December 2016, Tolley had an additional appointment as Minister for Youth. On 20 December 2016 she became the Minister for Children and the Minister of Local Government and held these roles, along with Minister of Social Development, until the Government was defeated at the 2017 general election.

Opposition and Deputy Speaker: 2017–2020
Tolley was appointed Deputy Speaker of the House of Representatives in November 2017. In this role, she chaired a cross-party steering group steering group to develop a parliamentary code of conduct, as an outcome of an independent review into bullying and harassment in the parliamentary workplace.

Along with former state services minister Paula Bennett, Tolley was accused by New Zealand First party leader Winston Peters in 2017 of leaking information about his incorrectly filed superannuation application. Tolley admitted having told her sister of the situation before it was reported by media, but was not found to have alerted media.

At the end of 2019, Tolley declared her intention to run as a list-only candidate in the 2020 general election in hope of being able to be appointed Speaker of the House if National were able to form a government. She was succeeded as National's candidate for the East Coast electorate by Rotorua District Councillor Tania Tapsell. However, in June 2020, with National polling poorly, Tolley announced that she would instead retire at the 2020 election. She gave her valedictory statement on 23 July 2020.

Post-parliamentary career

On 9 February 2021, the Minister of Local Government appointed a Crown Commission to oversee all of Tauranga City Council's governance responsibilities  (with all existing elected members being discharged). Tolley was appointed Commission Chair.

Health
It emerged in 2010 that Tolley had undergone gastric bypass (stomach stapling) surgery in order to lose weight. Tolley joins other current and former New Zealand politicians including Rahui Katene, David Lange, Chester Borrows, Donna Awatere-Huata and Tariana Turia to have had gastric bypass surgery at some point in the past.

References

External links

Anne Tolley MP official site

|-

|-

|-

|-

1953 births
Living people
New Zealand National Party MPs
New Zealand education ministers
Members of the Cabinet of New Zealand
Members of the New Zealand House of Representatives
Women government ministers of New Zealand
New Zealand list MPs
People from Napier, New Zealand
Unsuccessful candidates in the 2002 New Zealand general election
New Zealand MPs for North Island electorates
Deputy mayors of places in New Zealand
Napier City Councillors
21st-century New Zealand politicians
21st-century New Zealand women politicians
Women members of the New Zealand House of Representatives
Candidates in the 2017 New Zealand general election
New Zealand justices of the peace
People educated at William Colenso College